Kottigehara is a village located atop the Charmadi ghat in Mudigere taluk of Chikkamagaluru district of Karnataka state, India. It is located 16 km from Mudigere town.The nearest railway stations are at Chikkamagaluru (47 km), Hassan (87 km) and Mangaluru (104 km) respectively. The nearest international airport is Mangalore International Airport.

References

Villages in Chikkamagaluru district